"Beverly Hills" is a song by American rock band Weezer. It is the first single from the band's fifth album, Make Believe. "Beverly Hills" was released to US radio on March 28, 2005. The song features Stephanie Eitel of Agent Sparks on the chorus on backup vocals, performing the "gimme, gimme" hook.

Background 
Rivers Cuomo's story behind "Beverly Hills": "I was at the opening of the new Hollywood Bowl and I flipped through the program and I saw a picture of Wilson Phillips. And for some reason I just thought how nice it would be to marry, like, an 'established' celebrity and live in Beverly Hills and be part of that world. And it was a totally sincere desire. And then I wrote that song, Beverly Hills. For some reason, by the time it came out—and the video came out—it got twisted around into something that seemed sarcastic. But originally it wasn't meant to be sarcastic at all."

Cuomo stated that "Beverly Hills" and the solo, third verse, and last chorus of "Falling for You" (from Pinkerton) are his proudest musical achievements: "It's incredibly fun: a great beat, guitar riffs, catchy vocal style. Besides that, I think the lyrics are incredible in a very understated way. I might as well enjoy my life and watch the stars play. I love it! With this one song we were able to transcend our little niche and connect with all kinds of people, young and old, from all kinds of backgrounds."

Chart performance

The song is the band's most commercially successful single. It topped the Billboard Modern Rock Tracks chart for a week, spending months near the top of the Billboard Hot 100 (peaking at number 10) and being certified gold on June 6, 2005; it was also the band's first song to chart there since "Undone – The Sweater Song" at number 57 in 1994 after 11 years since the rest of Weezer's other hits from the past had only managed to chart only on the Hot 100 Airplay or the Bubbling Under Hot 100 chart. As of September 2018, it is still the band's highest-charting Hot 100 single. As of January 2006, the digital single has been purchased over 962,000 times on iTunes. It also did very well on other Billboard charts, such as Adult Top 40 (number eight peak), Mainstream Top 40 (number two peak), Hot Digital Songs (number one peak) and Mainstream Rock Tracks (number 26 peak).

The song also made the top 10 on the UK Singles Chart, peaking at number nine, and remaining on the chart for five weeks. The song was nominated for Best Rock Song at the 48th Annual Grammy Awards, the first ever nomination for the band. The video for the song was nominated at the 2005 MTV Video Music Awards for Best Rock Video. The song won College Song of the Year at the 54th Annual Broadcast Music Incorporated Pop Awards. "Beverly Hills" stayed at number one on the Modern Rock charts for one week. It was the first number one for Weezer, but this record was later met with "Perfect Situation," Make Believes third single, which held the pole position for four weeks. The song was the third highest selling digital download of 2005 in the US according to Nielsen SoundScan.

Music video
The music video for this song, directed by Marcos Siega, was filmed at the Playboy Mansion (which is actually not located in Beverly Hills, but the neighboring community of Holmby Hills), with Hugh Hefner making a cameo appearance at the beginning.

Track listings

UK 7-inch picture disc
A. "Beverly Hills" – 3:24
B. "Butterfly" (live) – 3:56

European CD single
 "Beverly Hills" – 3:20
 "Island in the Sun" (live) – 3:54

European enhanced CD single
 "Beverly Hills" – 3:20
 "Island in the Sun" (live) – 3:54
 "Butterfly" (live) – 3:56
 "Beverly Hills" (video)

Personnel
 Rivers Cuomo – lead guitar, lead vocals, talk box
 Patrick Wilson – drums, percussion
 Brian Bell – rhythm guitar, backing vocals
 Stephanie Eitel – additional backing vocals
 Scott Shriner – bass guitar
 Rick Rubin – producer
 Rich Costey – mixer

Charts

Weekly charts

Year-end charts

Certifications

Release history

Cover versions
"Weird Al" Yankovic included the song in his polka medley "Polkarama!" from his 2006 album, Straight Outta Lynwood.

References

External links
 
 Video Shoot

Weezer songs
2004 songs
2005 singles
Beverly Hills, California
Geffen Records singles
Music videos directed by Marcos Siega
Rap rock songs
Song recordings produced by Rick Rubin
Songs about Los Angeles
Songs written by Rivers Cuomo